The George Washington Purnell House in Snow Hill, Maryland, is a gothic revival house built around 1860.  The frame-and-weatherboard house retains its original decorative millwork; and is enhanced by a cast-iron fence along the street frontage.

It was listed on the National Register of Historic Places in 1996.

References

Houses in Worcester County, Maryland
Houses on the National Register of Historic Places in Maryland
Gothic Revival architecture in Maryland
Houses completed in 1860
National Register of Historic Places in Worcester County, Maryland